a junction passenger railway station in the city of Katori, Chiba Japan, operated by the East Japan Railway Company (JR East).

Lines
Katori Station is served by the Narita Line, and is located 43.6 kilometers from the terminus of line at Sakura Station. It is also the nominal terminal station for the Kashima Line, although all Kashima Line trains terminate at Sawara Station.

Station layout
The station has two opposed side platforms connected by a footbridge to a small single-story station building. The station is unattended.

Platforms

History

Katori Station was opened on November 10, 1931. The station building was replaced in 1986.  The station was absorbed into the JR East network upon the privatization of the Japanese National Railways (JNR) on April 1, 1987.

Passenger statistics
In fiscal 2006, the station was used by an average of 232 passengers daily.

Surrounding area
 Katori Middle School

See also
 List of railway stations in Japan

References

External links

Katori Station information (JR East) 

Railway stations in Japan opened in 1931
Railway stations in Chiba Prefecture
Narita Line
Kashima Line
Katori, Chiba